The 1964 Greenwich Council election took place on 7 May 1964 to elect members of Greenwich London Borough Council in London, England. The whole council was up for election and the Labour party gained control of the council.

Background
These elections were the first to the newly formed borough. Previously elections had taken place in the Metropolitan Borough of Greenwich and Metropolitan Borough of Woolwich. These boroughs were joined to form the new London Borough of Greenwich by the London Government Act 1963.

A total of 140 candidates stood in the election for the 60 seats being contested across 27 wards. These included a full slate from the Labour party, while the Conservative and Liberal parties stood 58 and 16 respectively. Other candidates included 6 from the Communist party. There were 21 two-seat wards and 6 three-seat wards.

This election had aldermen as well as directly elected councillors.  Labour got 9 aldermen and the Conservatives 1.

The Council was elected in 1964 as a "shadow authority" but did not start operations until 1 April 1965.

Election result
The results saw Labour gain the new council with a majority of 38 after winning 49 of the 60 seats. Overall turnout in the election was 36.0%. This turnout included 1,018 postal votes.

Ward results

References

1964
Greenwich
Greenwich London Borough Council election